Lochmaeocles marmoratus is a species of beetle in the family Cerambycidae. It was described by Casey in 1913. It is known from the United States and Mexico.

References

marmoratus
Beetles described in 1913